Wylie Independent School District can refer to:

 Wylie Independent School District (Collin County, Texas), United States
 Wylie Independent School District (Taylor County, Texas), United States